Antonio Leal (born 25 June 1987) is a Venezuelan foil fencer, Pan American champion in 2010 and bronze medallist at the 2011 Pan American Games. He also won a gold medal in the individual foil event at the 2013 Bolivarian Games, as well as a gold medal in team épée and a silver medal in team foil.

References

4  http://www.deportesrcn.com/mas-deportes/juegos-bolivarianos-2017/venezuela-gana-las-dos-primeras-medallas-de-oro-en-esgrima-en

Venezuelan male épée fencers
Venezuelan male foil fencers
Living people
1987 births
Pan American Games bronze medalists for Venezuela
Fencers at the 2016 Summer Olympics
Olympic fencers of Venezuela
Pan American Games medalists in fencing
Fencers at the 2011 Pan American Games
South American Games bronze medalists for Venezuela
South American Games medalists in fencing
Competitors at the 2010 South American Games
Sportspeople from Barquisimeto
Medalists at the 2011 Pan American Games
21st-century Venezuelan people